Luis Peral Guerra (born 1950) is a Spanish Christian-Democrat politician. A former senator, city councillor of Madrid and member of the Assembly of Madrid, he served as Minister of Labor and Minister of Education of the Government of the Community of Madrid.

Biography 
Born on 5 November 1950 in Madrid, son of real estate developer and architect Luis Peral Buesa and Mariela Guerra Zunzunegui; he is the grandson of General Luis Peral Sáez, aide-de-camp of Francisco Franco and of Juan Bautista Guerra García, lawyer and Member of Parliament for Palencia from the CEDA, murdered at the Monte Saja (Cantabria) in October 1936, during the Civil War.

PhD in History, with International Mention, from Universidad CEU-San Pablo, Madrid. He was awarded a "Summa cum laude" for his thesis "Economic Policies of the Second Spanish Republic. Spain in the Great Depression". During the PhD program he has completed stays at the London School of Economics and at the University of Edinburgh.

He obtained before Master (Licenciado) degrees in Economics and in Law  from Universidad Complutense de Madrid.

A member of the City Council of Madrid between 1979 and 1987, he had been elected for the first time in the 1979 municipal election as candidate of the Union of the Democratic Centre (UCD); he renovated his seat for a second term in the 1983 election, this time as candidate of the electoral coalition between People's Alliance, the People's Democratic Party and the Liberal Union (AP-PDP-UL).

He married María Ferré y de la Peña in 1992 at the chapel of the Colegio de Nuestra Señora del Pilar.

Following the 1995 accession of the People's Party (PP) to the Government of the Community of Madrid with 1995 Alberto Ruiz-Gallardón as regional president, Peral was appointed Vice-Minister of Public Works, Urbanism and Transports, becoming the right-hand of Luis Eduardo Cortés. From 1995 to 2001 the extension of Madrid underground Metro was doubled with 114 new kilometers. 101.000 new state-subsidized apartments were built, 12.663 of them by the Instituto de la Vivienda de Madrid (IVIMA) and 2.700 families that lived in shanty dwellings were housed in apartments by the Instituto de Realojamiento e Integración Social (IRIS). New roads were built, including M.45 Motorway, where the shadow toll system was employed.

He ran as the 22nd candidate in the PP list for the 1999 regional election in Madrid, becoming a member of the regional legislature for the first time; he renovated the seat in the next five terms of the regional legislature.

In the context of a cabinet reshuffle that took place in September 2001 in which the number of regional government ministries increased from 9 to 11, Peral was appointed as the new Minister of Labor. While he headed the Labour Department occupational training was promoted as well as jobs for disabled persons, through the Regional Employment Service, as well as job safety with the negotiation with trade unions and employers of the first Regional Plan for the Prevention of Job Hazards.

Once the government of Esperanza Aguirre started, Peral became Minister of Education. He was the only minister from the Ruiz-Gallardón era, remaining in the cabinet after the transition of power in 2003. While he headed the Education Department 165 state owned educational centers were built (72 infant schools, 75 primary schools and 18 secondary schools), there were 53.000 new infant schools places for children from 0 to 3 years, the Spanish-English Bilingual Program was developed, as well as the new Priority State Schools Plan. School grants for meals and textbooks were very much increased. In March 2005 the Education Department and 19 entities from the educational community signed the Agreement for the Improvement of the Educational Quality 2005-2008, with a budget of 1.600 million euros. In October of the same year took place the signing of the Financing Plan for Madrid Region Public Universities 2006-2010 and in December 2006 the Investment Plan 2007-2011 for those universities was signed.

During the Aguirre Government, in his capacity as regional minister of Education, he chaired the board of trustees of the Cardenal Cisneros Foundation (owner of the Centro de Enseñanza Superior Cardenal Cisneros).

Between 2007 and 2015, during the 8th, 9th and 10th terms of the Cortes Generales, Peral served as Senator, designated by the regional legislature. Spokesman of the Partido Popular (PP) for Interior (2008-2011) and Education (2011-2015), he took part representing the PP in the Traffic Law modification in 2009, in the 2010 Asylum Law and in the 2013 Law for the Improvement of Quality in Education (LOMCE). He promoted amendments in the modifications of the Penal Code in 2010 and 2015 (especially in the articles related with human trafficking and sexual crimes against minors), in the 2009 Immigration Law and in the 2010 Abortion Law. During the X Legislature, Luis Peral made 15 parliamentary questions in the Senate Plenary sessions and 138 in the Senate Committees and promoted 3 Motions in Plenary sessions and 4 in Committees, including a Motion about support to the Family, a Motion for the dissolution of city councils governed by the political arm of ETA terrorist group, according to the Political Parties Law  and a Motion about Human Rights Violations in Central Africa.

A member of the most conservative sector of the PP, opposed to abortion and surrogacy, during his mandate as Minister of Education (2003–2007) the region delayed the implementation of the subject of Educación para la Ciudadanía promoted by the national government of José Luis Rodríguez Zapatero. Peral broke the party discipline in March 2016 when he deliberately missed the voting for the Law against the LGTB-Phobia promoted by the PP government presided by Cristina Cifuentes, after his request for a separate voting for 6 of the 81 articles of that law was rejected by the PP parliamentary group. He resigned his seat as member of the Assembly in December 2016 alleging "personal reasons", and also announced the end of his political activity.

He was indicted by the Audiencia Nacional in July 2018, and cited to declare in September, on the basis of an accusation for crimes of misappropriation and prevarication in the approval of the purchase of Inassa by the regional Council of Government presided by Ruiz-Gallardón. In May 2019, Manuel García-Castellón (judge at the helm of the Central Instruction Court number 6 of the Audiencia Nacional) dismissed all the criminal charges pressed against Ruiz-Gallardón, Peral and a number of indicted people in the case, in line with the nolle prossed position adopted by the prosecutor.

Notes

References

Bibliography 
 

Madrid city councillors (1979–1983)
Madrid city councillors (1983–1987)
Members of the 5th Assembly of Madrid
Members of the 6th Assembly of Madrid
Members of the 7th Assembly of Madrid
Members of the 8th Assembly of Madrid
Members of the 9th Assembly of Madrid
Members of the 10th Assembly of Madrid
Members of the Senate of Spain
Government ministers of the Community of Madrid
Members of the People's Parliamentary Group (Assembly of Madrid)
1950 births
Living people